Helmut Jahn (January 4, 1940 – May 8, 2021) was a German-American architect, known for projects such as the Sony Center on Potsdamer Platz in Berlin, Germany; the Messeturm in Frankfurt, Germany; the Thompson Center in Chicago; One Liberty Place in Philadelphia, Pennsylvania; and Suvarnabhumi Airport, in Bangkok, Thailand, among others.

His recent projects included 50 West Street, a residential tower in New York City in 2016 and the ThyssenKrupp Test Tower in Rottweil, Germany in 2017.

Life and career

Jahn was born Jan. 4, 1940 in Zirndorf, near Nuremberg, Germany. His father, Wilhelm Anton Jahn, was a schoolteacher in special education. His mother, Karolina Wirth, was a housewife. Jahn grew up watching the reconstruction of the city, which had been largely destroyed by Allied bombing campaigns.

In 1966, he went to Chicago to further study architecture under Myron Goldsmith and Fazlur Khan at the Illinois Institute of Technology on a Rotary Scholarship, earning a Master's degree in 1967.

Murphy/Jahn
Jahn joined Charles Francis Murphy's architecture firm, C. F. Murphy Associates, in 1967 and was appointed Executive Vice President and Director of Planning and Design of the firm in 1973.  He took sole control in 1981, renaming the firm Murphy/Jahn (even though Murphy had retired). Murphy died in 1985.

Death
Jahn was killed on May 8, 2021, while riding his bicycle in Campton Hills, a suburb of Chicago. The collision happened near his home and horse farm in St. Charles, Illinois, a Chicago suburb.

Architectural style and influences
Generally inspired by Ludwig Mies van der Rohe, yet opposed to the doctrinal application of modernism by his followers, in 1978, Jahn became the eighth member of the Chicago Seven. His architectural style shifted from the modernism of the Miesian tradition to a postmodernist one with high-tech stylizations. Jahn established his reputation in 1985 with the State of Illinois Center in Chicago which prompted him to be dubbed "Flash Gordon". In addition to the main seat in Chicago, the company has offices in Berlin and Shanghai.

On October 26, 2012, Helmut Jahn renamed Murphy/Jahn to simply JAHN.

Completed projects

Following is a partial list of completed projects:
1974 Kemper Arena, Kansas City, Missouri
1976 Kansas City Convention Center, also known as H. Roe Bartle Exhibition Hall, Kansas City, Missouri
1976 Auraria Learning Resources Center, Auraria Higher Education Center, Denver, Colorado
1976 John Marshall Courts Building, Richmond, Virginia
1977 Michigan City Public Library, Michigan City, Indiana
1977 Saint Mary's College Athletic Facility, Notre Dame, Indiana
1978 W.W. Grainger Headquarters, Skokie, Illinois
1978 Rust-Oleum Corporation International Headquarters, Vernon Hills, Illinois
1978 La Lumiere Gymnasium, La Porte, Indiana
1979 Imperial Bank Tower Costa Mesa, California
1980 Horizon Bank (515 5th Street Bank) Michigan City, Indiana
1980 Xerox Centre, (55 West Monroe St) Chicago
1981 United States Post Office, Oak Brook, Illinois
1981 De La Garza Career Center, East Chicago, Indiana
1981 Commonwealth Edison Company District Headquarters, Bolingbrook, Illinois
1982 Argonne Program Support Facility,  Argonne National Laboratory, Illinois
1982 Eagle River Vacation House (The Jahn House)  Eagle River, Wisconsin
1982 Area 2 Police Headquarters, Chicago
1982 Chicago Board of Trade Addition Chicago 
1982 One South Wacker Chicago 
1983 Agricultural Engineering Sciences Building Addition University of Illinois, Champaign, Illinois
1983 Learning Resources Center, College of DuPage, Glen Ellyn, Illinois
1983 First Source Centre, South Bend, Indiana
1984 11 Diagonal Street, Johannesburg, South Africa
1984 Plaza East Office Towers, Milwaukee
1984 Shand Morahan Corporate Headquarters, Evanston, Illinois
1984 701 Building (Craig-Hallom Building), Minneapolis
1984 O'Hare 'L' Station, O'Hare International Airport, Chicago
1985 James R. Thompson Center, Chicago
1985 362 West Street, Durban, South Africa
1986 Parktown Stands 102, 103, 85, 879, Johannesburg, South Africa
1986 MetroWest Office Building (2 Energy Center), Naperville, Illinois
1986 Oakbrook Terrace Tower, Oakbrook Terrace, Illinois
1987 Park Avenue Tower, New York City
1987 425 Lexington Avenue, New York City
1987 United Airlines Terminal 1 at O'Hare International Airport, Chicago
1987 America Apartments – 300 East 85th Street, New York, NY
1987 One Liberty Place, Philadelphia
1987 Cityspire, New York City
1987 Citigroup Center, Chicago
1988 Wilshire/Westwood, Los Angeles
1989 Trade Hall 1 (Halle 1), Frankfurt, Germany
1989 Metropolitan Transportation Authority Headquarters, 130 Livingston Street, Downtown Brooklyn
1990 Bank of America Tower, Jacksonville, Florida 
1990 Two Liberty Place, Philadelphia
1991 One America Plaza, San Diego
1991 Messeturm, Frankfurt, Germany
1992 Hyatt Regency, Roissy, Paris
1992 120 North LaSalle, Chicago, Illinois
1993 Hitachi Tower, Singapore
1993 Caltex House, Singapore
1994 Hotel Kempinski, Munich, Germany
1994 Kurfürstendamm 70, Berlin, Germany
1996 Fortis Bank Tower (Blaak 555), Rotterdam, Netherlands
1996 Principal Financial Group Corporate Four Building, Des Moines, Iowa
1997 RCID Administration Building, Buena Vista, Florida
1998 Generale Bank Nederland, Rotterdam, Netherlands
1999 European Union Charlemagne building, Brussels, Belgium
1999 Munich Airport Center, Germany
2000 Sony Center Berlin, Germany
2000 Cologne Bonn Airport, Cologne, Germany
2000 HA·LO Headquarters (presently the headquarters of Shure), Niles, Illinois
2000 Imperial Bank Tower Renovation, Costa Mesa, California
2001 Neues Kranzler Eck, Berlin, Germany
2002 Kaufhof Galeria, Chemnitz, Germany
2002 Shanghai International Expo Centre, Shanghai, China
2002 Bayer AG Konzernzentrale
2003 Deutsche Post Tower, Bonn, Germany
2003 IIT Student Housing, Chicago
2003 Highlight Munich Business Towers, Munich, Germany
2004 Mannheimer Corporate Headquarters, Mannheim, Germany 
2004 Merck Serono Headquarters (Horizon Serono), Geneva, Switzerland
2005 Focus Media Center (Deutsche-Med-Platz), Rostock, Germany 
2006 Suvarnabhumi Airport, Bangkok, Thailand
2006 Seminaris Campus Hotel, Berlin, Germany
2007 Margot and Harold Schiff Residences, Chicago
2007 600 North Fairbanks, Chicago, USA
2008 Hegau Tower, Singen, Germany
2009 South Campus Chiller Plant, University of Chicago Chicago
2009 1999 K Street, Washington, D.C.
2010 Hafen Tower (Sign Tower), Speditionstrasse 1–3 Düsseldorf, Germany
2010 Veer Towers, Paradise, Nevada USA
2010 Weser Tower, Bremen, Germany
2010 Bonn Airport Parking, Cologne, Germany 
2011 Joe and Rika Mansueto Library, Chicago, USA
2012 Leatop Plaza, Guangzhou, China
2012 Skyline Tower, Munich, Germany
2012 Japan Post, Tokyo, Japan
2013 Cosmopolitan Twarda 2/4, Warsaw, Poland
2014 Zunda Towers, Riga, Latvia
2016 Doha Exhibition and Convention Center, Qatar
2016 Shanghai Convention Center, Shanghai, China 
2016 50 West Street, New York City, USA
2017 ThyssenKrupp Test Tower, Rottweil, Germany
2017 1900 Reston Station, Reston, Virginia
In his native town of Nuremberg, however, a project by Jahn was rejected by a citizens' referendum in 1996.

Select awards
1991 – "Ten Most Influential Living American Architects" from the American Institute of Architects.
1993 – "Outstanding Achievement/Architect Award" from the American Academy of Art, Chicago.
1994 – Officer's cross of the Order of Merit of the Federal Republic of Germany
2002 – Institute Honour Award of the American Institute of Architects for the Sony Center.
2005 – Murphy/Jahn, Inc. recipient of the AIA Architecture Firm Award.
2005 – Pratt Institute Legends Award
2012 – AIA Chicago Lifetime Achievement Award
2018 – ENR Safety Award of Merit: 1900 Metro Reston Plaza

Personal life

Jahn was interested in yachting, and in the late 1990s owned at least three yachts named Flash Gordon (one of his nicknames). In 1995, Jahn's Flash Gordon 2 won the annual Chicago to Mackinac Race, the oldest freshwater yacht race in the world. In 1998, Jahn invited his fellow Vietnam War veteran, George Henry, to race with him in the Waterbury Channel Open. In 1997, Flash Gordon 3 won the Admiral's Cup. In 2017 the Flash Gordon 6 team captured its third straight North American Championship.

He married Deborah Ann Lampe, an interior designer, in December 1970. Their son Evan was born in 1978.

Images

References

External links

Official website

Architect Helmut Jahn renames firm, promotes successor
Highlight towers
The New Modernism of Helmut Jahn

 
1940 births
2021 deaths
20th-century American architects
Technical University of Munich alumni
Illinois Institute of Technology alumni
Members of the European Academy of Sciences and Arts
Officers Crosses of the Order of Merit of the Federal Republic of Germany
German emigrants to the United States
20th-century German architects
21st-century American architects
21st-century German architects
People from Fürth (district)
Road incident deaths in Illinois
People from St. Charles, Illinois
Fellows of the American Institute of Architects
Postmodern architects